The Solomon Islands national basketball team is the team that represents the Solomon Islands in international basketball and is a member of FIBA Oceania.

Competitions

FIBA Melanesia Basketball Cup

References
2007 Solomon Islands National Basketball Team information

Men's national basketball teams
Basketball